Arianna Licelott Sánchez Matos (born 29 November 1995) is a Dominican Republic badminton player.

Achievements

BWF International Challenge/Series 
Women's doubles

Mixed doubles

  BWF International Challenge tournament
  BWF International Series tournament
  BWF Future Series tournament

References

External links 
 

1995 births
Living people
Dominican Republic female badminton players
Competitors at the 2014 Central American and Caribbean Games
21st-century Dominican Republic women